Wiebelsdorf is a village and a former municipality in the district of Greiz, in Thuringia, Germany. Since 1 December 2011, it is part of the town Auma-Weidatal.

References

Former municipalities in Thuringia
Grand Duchy of Saxe-Weimar-Eisenach